Yastika Bhatia (born 1 November 2000) is an Indian cricketer. In February 2021, Bhatia earned her maiden call-up to the India women's cricket team, for their limited overs matches against South Africa. Bhatia said that her selection to the national team was surreal, and thanked her coach and club for the opportunity. She had also played for the India Women's A team during their tour of Australia in December 2019.

In August 2021, Bhatia was again called up to the national team, for their series against Australia, including being named in India's squad for the one-off women's Test match. She made her Women's One Day International (WODI) debut on 21 September 2021, for India against Australia. She made her Test debut on 30 September 2021, for India against Australia. She made her Women's Twenty20 International (WT20I) debut on 7 October 2021, also against Australia.

In January 2022, she was named in India's team for the 2022 Women's Cricket World Cup in New Zealand. In July 2022, she was named in India's team for the cricket tournament at the 2022 Commonwealth Games in Birmingham, England.

References

External links
 
 

2000 births
Living people
People from Vadodara
Cricketers from Gujarat
Baroda women cricketers
IPL Velocity cricketers
Mumbai Indians (WPL) cricketers
Indian women cricketers
India women Test cricketers
India women One Day International cricketers
India women Twenty20 International cricketers
Cricketers at the 2022 Commonwealth Games
Commonwealth Games silver medallists for India
Commonwealth Games medallists in cricket
Medallists at the 2022 Commonwealth Games